Clairmont, with French roots meaning "clear/light-colored/shining hill/mountain", may refer to:

People
 Claire Clairmont (1798–1879), stepsister of writer Mary Shelley
 Corwin Clairmont (born 1946), Native American printmaker and artist
 Frederic F. Clairmont, Canadian economist
 Philip Clairmont (1949–1984), New Zealand artist

Places
 Clairmont, Alberta, a hamlet in northern Alberta, Canada 
 Clairmont, New Mexico, Catron County, New Mexico 
 Clairmont, United States Virgin Islands, a settlement on the island of Saint Croix
 Clairmont Road, a thoroughfare in the state of Georgia

See also

 Clairmont Advanced (education roundtable)
 Clairemont (disambiguation)
 Claremont (disambiguation)
 Claremont Hotel (disambiguation)
 Clermont (disambiguation)